Section 15.11 is a provision in the Ohio Constitution that makes it unconstitutional for the state to recognize or perform same-sex marriages or civil unions.  Approved as a constitutional amendment in 2004 under the name of "Issue One", it received support from 61.7% of voters.

The text of the amendment states:
Only a union between one man and one woman may be a marriage valid in or recognized by this state and its political subdivisions. This state and its political subdivisions shall not create or recognize a legal status for relationships of unmarried individuals that intends to approximate the design, qualities, significance or effect of marriage.

The LGBT rights organization Equality Ohio was founded in response to the passage of Issue 1.

Many political experts credit the amendment with bolstering turnout in Rural Ohio, leading to many religious supporters of President George W. Bush to turnout to the polls, helping him win the state of Ohio by a narrow 2 point margin.

Results

County breakdown

References

External links
 The Money Behind the 2004 Marriage Amendments -- National Institute on Money in State Politics

LGBT in Ohio
U.S. state constitutional amendments banning same-sex unions
2004 in LGBT history
Initiatives in the United States
Same-sex marriage ballot measures in the United States
2004 Ohio elections
2004 ballot measures
Ohio ballot measures
LGBT rights in Ohio